Saniculiphyllum is a monotypic genus of flowering plants belonging to the family Saxifragaceae. The only species is Saniculiphyllum guangxiense.

Its native range is Southern China.

References

Saxifragaceae
Saxifragaceae genera
Monotypic Saxifragales genera